Caprylic acid, also known under the systematic name octanoic acid or C8 Acid, is a saturated fatty acid, medium-chain fatty acid (MCFA). It has the structural formula , and is a colorless oily liquid that is minimally soluble in water with a slightly unpleasant rancid-like smell and taste. Salts and esters of octanoic acid are known as octanoates or caprylates. It is a common industrial chemical, which is produced by oxidation of the C8 aldehyde. Its compounds are found naturally in the milk of various mammals and as a minor constituent of coconut oil and palm kernel oil.

Two other acids are named after goats via the Latin word capra: caproic acid (C6) and capric acid (C10). Together, these three fatty acids comprise 15% of the fatty acids in goat milk fat.

Uses
Caprylic acid is used commercially in the production of esters used in perfumery and also in the manufacture of dyes.

Caprylic acid is an antimicrobial pesticide used as a food contact surface sanitizer in commercial food handling establishments on dairy equipment, food processing equipment, breweries, wineries, and beverage processing plants.  It is also used as disinfectant in health care facilities, schools/colleges, animal care/veterinary facilities, industrial facilities, office buildings, recreational facilities, retail and wholesale establishments, livestock premises, restaurants, and hotels/motels.  In addition, caprylic acid is used as an algicide, bactericide, fungicide, and herbicide in nurseries, greenhouses, garden centers, and interiors, and on ornamentation. Products containing caprylic acid are formulated as soluble concentrate/liquids and ready-to-use liquids.

Caprylic acid plays an important role in the body's regulation of energy input and output, a function which is performed by the hormone ghrelin. The sensation of hunger is a signal that the body requires an input of energy in the form of food consumption. Ghrelin stimulates hunger by triggering receptors in the hypothalamus. In order to activate these receptors, ghrelin must undergo a process called acylation in which it acquires an acyl group, and caprylic acid provides this by linking at a specific serine site on ghrelin molecules. Other fatty acids in the same position have similar effects on hunger.

The acyl chloride of caprylic acid is used in the synthesis of perfluorooctanoic acid.

Dietary uses

Caprylic acid is taken as a dietary supplement. In the body, caprylic acid would be found as octanoate, or unprotonated caprylic acid.

Some studies have shown that medium-chain triglycerides (MCTs) can help in the process of excess calorie burning, and thus weight loss;  however, a systematic review of the evidence concluded that the overall results are inconclusive.  Also, interest in MCTs has been shown by endurance athletes and the bodybuilding community, but MCTs have not been found to be beneficial to improved exercise performance.

Medical uses
Caprylic acid has been studied as part of a ketogenic diet to treat children with intractable epilepsy. Caprylic acid is currently being researched as a treatment for essential tremor.

See also
 List of saturated fatty acids
 List of carboxylic acids

References

External links 
 Coconut Oil - Caprylic Acid: Coconut Oil’s Secret
 Caprylic Acid Benefits - Caprylic Acid: Benefits & Side Effects

Antifungals
Alkanoic acids
Biologically-based therapies
Fatty acids
Triglycerides